Alireza Abbasi (born: 1974, Qom) is an Iranian Shia principlist representative of Karaj, Fardis and Eshtehard in the Islamic Consultative Assembly (the Parliament of Iran). He is a member of the faculty of'the Campus of Agriculture and Natural Resources, University of Tehran.

Alireza Abbasi (or "Ali Reza Abbasi") was born in 1974 in a village around the city of Qom. He finished his elementary-education in the village, and passed his high-school education in Qom. He was accepted at the University of Tehran and possesses a master's degree and a doctorate. Ali-reza Abbasi has two children.

According to Tasnim News Agency, Abbasi was elected as the representative of Karaj, Fardis and Eshtehard in the Islamic Consultative Assembly by capturing 27,010 votes from 41,534 votes. He was elected in the second round of the elections—in competition with Fatemeh Ajorlou.

See also 

 Islamic Consultative Assembly
 Fatemeh Ajorlou

References 

Members of the 11th Islamic Consultative Assembly
Iranian politicians
Living people
People from Qom
Islamic Consultative Assembly
1947 births